The Clifton Oyster Rocks are a series of islets located off the coast of the Clifton neighbourhood of Karachi, Sindh, Pakistan. The islands were under the control of the Pakistani Navy until 2006, when the Karachi city government decided to include the island as part of its plans to renovate the city. As part of these plans, the Port Fountain was constructed at the base of the northern island. It shoots water up to 620 feet in the air, and is the second-tallest fountain in the world.

Gallery

See also
 List of islands of Pakistan

References

Islands of Karachi
Uninhabited islands of Pakistan
Clifton, Karachi
Islands of Sindh